Hive (Albanian: Zgjoi) is a 2021 Kosovan drama film written and directed by Blerta Basholli in her directorial debut. The film stars Yllka Gashi, Çun Lajçi and Aurita Agushi. It premiered at the 2021 Sundance Film Festival on January 31, 2021 and became the first film in Sundance history to win all three main awards – the Grand Jury Prize, the Audience Award and the Directing Award – in the World Cinema Dramatic Competition. It was selected as the Kosovan entry for the Best International Feature Film at the 94th Academy Awards.

Premise
The movie is based on the true story of a woman, Fahrije, who goes against misogynistic societal expectations to become an entrepreneur after her husband went missing during the 1998-1999 Kosovo War. She starts selling her own ajvar and honey, recruiting other women in the process.

Fahrije’s husband has been missing since the war in Kosovo, and along with their grief, her family is struggling financially. In order to provide for them she launches a small agricultural business, but in the traditional patriarchal village where she lives, her ambition and efforts to empower herself and other women are not seen as positive things. She struggles not only to keep her family afloat but also against a hostile community who is rooting for her to fail.

Cast
 Yllka Gashi as Fahrije
 Çun Lajçi as Haxhi
 Aurita Agushi as Zamira
 Kumrije Hoxha as Nazmije
 Adriana Matoshi as Lume
 Molikë Maxhuni as Emine
 Blerta Ismaili as Edona

Production
The film was produced by Ikone Studio, Industria Film and was co-produced by AlbaSky Film, Alva Film, Black Cat Production.

Release
The film had its world premiere at the 2021 Sundance Film Festival on January 31, 2021 in the World Cinema Dramatic Competition section. On September 8, 2021, Zeitgeist Films and Kino Lorber acquired the film's U.S. distribution rights and set it for a November 5, 2021 theatrical release in the United States.

Reception

Accolades

See also
 Cinema of Kosovo
 List of submissions to the 94th Academy Awards for Best International Feature Film
 List of Kosovan submissions for the Academy Award for Best International Feature Film
Honeyland

References

External links
 
 
 

2021 films
2021 drama films
2021 independent films
Kosovan drama films
Albanian drama films
Macedonian drama films
Swiss drama films
Swiss independent films
Sundance Film Festival award winners
Icon Productions films